Filinskaya is a rural locality (a village) in Verkhovazhskoye Rural Settlement, Verkhovazhsky District, Vologda Oblast, Russia. The population was 3 as of 2002.

Geography 
The distance to Verkhovazhye is 5 km. Verkhneye Makarovo, Abakumovskaya, Ruchyevskaya, Yelezovskaya, Tyoply Ruchey, Yeksinskoye, Somitsyno are the nearest rural localities.

References 

Rural localities in Verkhovazhsky District